This is a list of authors of Christian fiction.

Allegory

Amish

Biblical
KD Holmberg

Contemporary

Suspense/thriller

Historical

Novels

Fiction for children

Literary

Other

See also
 Christian novel
 List of Christian novels
 Christy Award

References

 Contemporary Christian Authors: Lives and Works By Janice DeLong, Rachel E. Schwedt 
 Christian Fiction: A Guide to the Genre By John Mort

 List
Christian novelists
Christian fiction
Fiction authors